Alan Stanley Jones,  (born 2 November 1946) is an Australian former Formula One driver. He was the first driver to win a Formula One World Championship with the Williams team, becoming the 1980 World Drivers' Champion and the second Australian to do so following triple World Champion Sir Jack Brabham. He competed in a total of 117 Grands Prix, winning 12 and achieving 24 podium finishes. In 1978 Jones won the Can-Am championship driving a Lola.

Jones is also the last Australian driver to win the Australian Grand Prix, winning the 1980 event at Calder Park Raceway, having lapped the field consisting mostly of Formula 5000 cars while he was driving his Formula One Championship winning Williams FW07B.

Early life and career
Jones attended Xavier College and is the son of Stan Jones, an Australian racing driver and winner of the 1959 Australian Grand Prix, and wanted to follow in his footsteps. Jones initially worked in his father's Holden dealership while racing a Mini and a Cooper. The younger Jones left for Europe in 1967, to make a name for himself, but found that he could not afford even a Formula Ford drive. He therefore returned home but was back in the UK in 1970 and set about building his career in company with compatriot Brian McGuire.
The two men bought and sold second-hand cars and Jones was eventually able to afford a Formula Three, Lotus 41 which he intended to adapt to Formula Two specification and take back to Australia to sell, in order to finance a season of Formula Three. However, the machine was written off in a testing accident at Brands Hatch in which Jones suffered a broken leg.

In late 1970, Jones signed with a firm for whom McGuire was working, designed to promote drivers' interests and was selected to compete in a series of races in Brazil. However, in his first two races the engine failed and in the third the gearbox broke, which meant the opportunity ended.

For 1971, Jones campaigned a Brabham BT 28 converted to BT35 specification, in Formula Three and had a moderately successful season which led to a series of tests for March at Silverstone. However, despite the success of the test, Jones was not offered a drive by March and for 1972, drove a GRD in Formula Three. Jones did enough that season to be kept on by GRD for the next year with a new sponsor and only lost the 1973 championship due to a misfiring engine in the last round at Brands Hatch. In 1974, Jones began the season in Formula Atlantic but felt it was a very amateurish effort, but a chance meeting with Harry Stiller led to a drive in the latter's March 74.  At the end of the season, Jones made his F5000 debut for Stiller in the final round of the European Championship at Brands Hatch in a Chevron B24/28 owned by John MacDonald.  It was planned to enter Formula 5000 for 1975. However, Stiller's initial plans fell through but after some delay, during which Jones was effectively unemployed, Stiller arranged to purchase a Formula One Hesketh 308 and signed Jones to drive the car.

Formula One

1975–1977: Hesketh, Hill, Surtees and Shadow

His first race was the 1975 Spanish Grand Prix at the fast Montjuïc circuit in the purchased Hesketh although the weekend turned out to be one of the most tragic in Formula One history 
when Rolf Stommelen's crash caused the death of five spectators. After four races in Formula One the team ceased racing after Stiller moved abroad. However, Jones was named as a replacement for the injured Stommelen in Graham Hill's team. His best finish with Hill, in four races for the team, was fifth at the Nürburgring.
 
He earned his first full-time Formula One drive in 1976, in John Surtees' team. Jones' car was known for its infamous Durex sponsorship which led the BBC refusing to cover Formula One races during the season. He managed several good finishes in the TS19, a fourth in Japan in the final race of the season being the best of them. Jones refused to drive for Surtees in 1977, preferring to sit out a season than continue with the team.

Jones was racing in America when he was signed by the Shadow team as a replacement for Tom Pryce, who had been killed in a freak racing accident in South Africa. He made the most of the opportunity and won at the Österreichring for his maiden victory, finishing seventh in the championship, with 22 points.

1978–1981: Williams
By late 1977, he had caught the attention of Frank Williams as well as Enzo Ferrari. Ferrari had a meeting with him at Maranello, but in the end, Gilles Villeneuve got the drive. Williams, who was looking to rebuild his Formula One racing team. Williams Grand Prix had struggled for success in its first years and after Williams had restarted his team in 1977, Jones was entrusted to give them their first taste of it. As well as Williams, he also signed with Haas-Hall for 1978, and competed in a Lola 333CS in the Can-Am series, winning the title. Jones took nine poles in ten races but missed the Laguna Seca race due to a Formula One scheduling conflict. Stand-in Brian Redman finished twelfth in that race after the kill wire was crimped under a valve cover, resulting in intermittent ignition. Of the nine races in which he competed, Jones won five (Atlanta, Mosport, Road America, Mid-Ohio, and Riverside.) He finished second to Elliot Forbes-Robinson at Charlotte after hitting a chicane and losing a spark plug wire, retired through accident at St Jovite and lost a radiator at Watkins Glen. He finished third at Trois-Rivières after losing a shift fork and being stuck with only second and fifth gears on the tight road circuit. At that race, water-injected brakes were first used in Can-Am, developed by the Haas team and copied with varying degrees of success by others. Jones ran one Can-Am race in 1979 (Mid-Ohio), where he and Keke Rosberg finished 1–2, with Jones winning his last Can-Am start. For Williams, his best result that season was a second-place finish at Watkins Glen. Jones helped put the team on the Formula One map in 1979 using the Williams FW07, after winning four races in the span of five events near the end of the season. Jones finished third in the championship that year, and it was the springboard to an excellent 1980 campaign. Jones's best years in Formula One had just begun, in the middle of the ground-effect era.

Jones won seven races in 1980, although the Spanish Grand Prix was later removed from the championship and the Australian Grand Prix was a non-championship race, so only five counted towards the Championship. Throughout the season he had a car which consistently made the podium, and he achieved ten during the year. At the end of the season he had beaten Nelson Piquet by 13 points in the standings, becoming Australia's first World Champion since Sir Jack Brabham. He had a good chance to repeat his success in 1981, but a very combative relationship with Carlos Reutemann led to an intense rivalry that possibly cost both drivers a chance at the championship. He finished four points behind Piquet for the championship and three behind Reutemann.

After winning the championship in 1980, Jones and Williams competed in the then non-championship Australian Grand Prix at Calder Park in November. Driving his FW07B against a field consisting mostly of Formula 5000's (and Bruno Giacomelli's Alfa Romeo 179), Jones, who had previously finished 4th in the race in 1977 (he was penalised 60 seconds for a jumped start, and officially finished just 20 seconds behind winner Warwick Brown showing that if not for the penalty he would have won by 40 seconds), joined his father Stan as a winner of the Australian Grand Prix.

From 1979 to 1981, Jones was awarded the No.1 driver of the season by the editor of the AUTOCOURSE annual. During his championship year in 1980, the AUTOCOURSE editor awarded Jones the No.1 slot not just because he was World Champion but because in the editor's opinion "Jones extracted every ounce of potential from the Williams FW07 -and more importantly, he did it consistently. All season Jones never gave anything less than his best." In 1981 despite missing the championship, the AUTOCOURSE editor still gave the No.1 driver award to Jones because "in 1981 Alan Jones was outstanding, his racing instincts sharper than ever, his driving aggressive and confident."

Later Formula One career: 1982–1986

A week later he again drove for Arrows in the non-championship Race of Champions at Brands Hatch where he qualified and finished third behind reigning World Champion Keke Rosberg (Williams) and rookie American driver Danny Sullivan (Tyrrell). This was to be his last drive for the team, a bid to raise enough money to drive in the French Grand Prix the week after the Race of Champions failed which saw Arrows use its regular drivers Marc Surer and Chico Serra (whom Jones had replaced at Long Beach) instead.

During a 2012 Grand Prix Legends interview, Jones revealed that he had been contacted by Ferrari to drive for the team from mid-1982 after the death of Gilles Villeneuve and the injury forced retirement of Didier Pironi. As he was enjoying life back in Australia at the time, Jones did not give them an answer straight away and basically gave them the run around, a move he regrets as it was possible that, as the 1980 World Champion, Ferrari would have wanted to keep him for 1983 when he was looking to make a comeback, which would have seen him drive the car which won the Constructors' Championship in 1983. After taking too long to give them an answer, the Scuderia instead offered the drive to  World Champion Mario Andretti who drove the last two races of the 1982 season at Monza and Caesars Palace.

Jones did not compete in Formula One during , though he did drive some World Sportscar Championship races in 1983 and 1984. He made a full-time comeback to F1 late in  when Team Haas was created and Jones became the first driver for the team. The American owned and sponsored team was based in England and made its debut at the 1985 Italian Grand Prix at Monza. Jones qualified the new Lola THL1 9.851 seconds slower than pole man Ayrton Senna in his Lotus-Renault and retired after only 6 laps with a blown engine. The comeback was unsuccessful more due to the Ford V6 engine's lack of power compared to its rivals from Honda, TAG-Porsche, BMW, Ferrari and Renault, than any lack of effort from the team and its drivers.

At the end of the 1986 season after the Haas team lost its sponsorship and ran out of money, Jones retired from Formula One for good having won 12 races, 6 pole positions and one World Championship.

Post Formula One career

Sports and Touring Car racing

Jones' post Formula One career was initially spasmodic in nature. Briefly in demand for his services as a Touring Car co-driver, he raced occasionally in his home country's biggest endurance race, the Bathurst 1000 but success was elusive. In 1982 he attempted his first full season of racing, driving a Porsche 935 to dominate the 1982 Australian GT Championship. This championship included races against local touring car ace Peter Brock driving Bob Jane's 6.0 litre Chevrolet Monza. The duels between Australia's two biggest motorsport names at the time have often been regarded as some of the best racing seen domestically in Australia. Soon after he made his first failed comeback to Formula One. During 1982 he formed his own touring Car team, combining the resources of V8 Ford Falcon driver Bob Morris and rotary Mazda RX-7 racer Barry Jones into a single two-car team but results were mixed and the exercise dissipated by the end of the season, though Jones and Jones did win the CRC 300 at Amaroo Park in a Mazda RX-7 (Alan Jones was to drive with Bob Morris in the Falcon in the Oran Park 250 endurance race, but elected after the race started to let Morris drive the 100 lap race solo. Morris went on to win the race). 1984 brought a top six finish at the 24 Hours of Le Mans with Kremer Racing, and a top four finish at the Bathurst 1000, again teaming with Warren Cullen in a Holden VK Commodore. Cullen and Jones, who drove the final stint in the race and required pain killing injections after having the steering wheel wrench out of his hands during practice which damaged ligaments in his elbow, were unlucky not to finish 2nd, but a brake problem with the car saw him forced to use more fuel than normal and a late race stop for fuel allowed the Holden Dealer Team VK Commodore of David Parsons and John Harvey to sneak into 2nd and the Mazda RX-7 of Allan Moffat and Gregg Hansford to claim 3rd.

Jones was quickly snapped up as teammate to Colin Bond in Bond's newly formed factory supported Network Alfa touring car team for the 1985 Australian Touring Car Championship driving an underpowered Alfa Romeo GTV6 in Australia's first full year using the international Group A touring car rules. After some giant killing performances in the early rounds of the championship, Jones abandoned his first serious ATCC campaign to make his second Formula One comeback with the Haas Lola team.

Jones joined Kremer Racing for the 1984 24 Hours of Le Mans where he would share a Porsche 956B with 1983 Le Mans winner (and fellow Aussie) Vern Schuppan along with former F1 driver Jean-Pierre Jarier. After dicing for the lead with the pole sitting Lancia LC2 of Bob Wollek and Alessandro Nannini for the first third of the race, damage caused when Schuppan was the innocent victim of a spinning Roger Dorchy, and finally a broken conrod, saw Jones finish his first 24 Hours of Le Mans start in 6th place. Jones had previously driven for the Kremer brothers when he and Schuppan drove a 956 to 5th place in the 1983 1000 km of Silversone. Later in 1984, Jones drove with Schuppan for the factory backed Rothmans Porsche team at the 1000 km of Sandown Park, the final round of the 1984 World Sportscar Championship and the first ever FIA World Championship race to be held in Australia. After Schuppan qualified the Porsche 956B 3rd behind teammates Stefan Bellof and Jochen Mass, Jones started the race and got the jump on the West German pair and had the honour of leading the first lap of the first FIA World Championship race ever held in Australia. Jones and Schuppan eventually finished 9th, 12 laps down on Bellof and Derek Bell after numerous punctures.

On 20 September 1987 at SUGO Jones won a round of All Japan Touring Car Championship driving Toyota Team Tom's, Group A, Toyota Supra MA70 Turbo. Unfortunately the factory backed Supra could not compete, even with the Private Ford Sierras, thus for the remaining two JGTC races he scored only one additional podium on 6 December at Suzuka where he finished 3rd. After returning home again in 1987 his career did not pick up again until a competitive 3rd placing at the 1988 Bathurst 1000 with Colin Bond's team in a Ford Sierra RS500, saw him signed up as full-time number two driver to Tony Longhurst in Longhurst's Frank Gardner run team to drive a Sierra in 1990. The Benson & Hedges sponsored Sierra's were brutally fast but disappointingly fragile and results were again elusive. The team switched to BMW M3 Evolution's in 1991 saw the return of reliability at the cost of speed. Jones took the occasional podium result while Longhurst took two wins against the all-powerful Nissan Skyline R32 GT-R's. A switch to Glenn Seton Racing mid-season in 1992 brought improved results and race wins and he finished runner up to his team leader Glenn Seton as their V8 Ford Falcons dominated the 1993 Australian Touring Car Championship. Jones' reputation as a hard charger was shown in the 1993 ATCC when he was involved in a number of incidents, most notably pushing the Holden Commodore of Mark Skaife off the track at Symmons Plains Raceway before also doing the same to the Holden Racing Team's Commodore driven by Australia's 1987 500cc Grand Prix motorcycle World Champion Wayne Gardner less than half a lap later. Rule changes to make the Commodore's more competitive saw the team's dominance fade over the next few years. The 1995 Bathurst 1000 looked to be a high point with a memorable 1–2 finish for their two cars fading into just a second for the car Jones shared with veteran Allan Grice, the pair finishing behind the Holden Commodore of ex-F1 driver Larry Perkins and Russell Ingall (Seton, leading by 5 seconds with just 9 laps remaining, retired with a dead engine).

By this point the team was sundering apart and Jones took the major sponsor (Philip Morris International) to form a new team with engineering brothers Ross and Jim Stone as partners, known commercially as Pack Leader Racing (the Pack Leader name came about as the use of the Peter Jackson cigarette brand was banned following the Australian Government's blanket ban on all cigarette advertising from 1 January 1996). Initially fast, the partnership was fading by 1997 and the Stones bought Jones out, re-badging the team as Stone Brothers Racing. Jones returned to race with Tony Longhurst's Longhurst Racing team again in 1998 by this time his form was fading. From 1999 onwards he no longer raced full-time, driving just the endurance races as a hired gun. His final race was with Dick Johnson Racing, driving into a 7th-placed finish at the 2002 Bathurst 1000.

CART
In August 1985, one month before his return to Formula One at the Italian Grand Prix, Jones' association with Team Haas owner Carl Haas saw him used as a substitute for injured Newman/Haas Racing driver (and  World F1 Champion) Mario Andretti in a Champ Car World Series race at Road America in Wisconsin. In his only IndyCar start and showing he had lost none of the speed, skill and determination that took him to the World Championship, Jones drove Andretti's Lola T900-Cosworth to third place behind Jacques Villeneuve Sr. (winner) and Mario's son Michael Andretti (2nd).

A1 Grand Prix
Jones then become involved in the Australian franchise of the A1 Grand Prix as Team Director in 2005 until the series demise in 2010.

Grand Prix Masters
He attempted to race in the Grand Prix Masters World Series at Kyalami in November 2005 but had to pull out before qualifying due to neck pains.

Media
This association with Nine saw him hosting F1 telecasts from Nine's Sydney studios working mostly with Darrell Eastlake, but sometimes with former Grand Prix motorcycle World Champion Barry Sheene on 500cc Grand Prix telecasts. Jones also worked as a pit reporter during the Australian Grand Prix where his relationships with those in F1 made it easier for him to obtain relevant information, and also as a pit reporter for Nine's broadcasts of the Australian Motorcycle Grand Prix.

In March 2013, Jones signed with Network Ten as a commentator for their Formula One coverage where he joins regular hosts Matthew White and former MotoGP rider Daryl Beattie.

Author
His autobiography AJ: How Alan Jones Climbed to the top of Formula One has been co-authored with motorsport writer Andrew Clarke was released in August 2017 by Penguin Random House.

Personal life
Jones separated from his wife Beverley in the late 1980s. In 1996 he began a relationship with Amanda Butler Davis and in 2001 their twins, Zara and Jack, were born.

Jones also has a daughter, Camilla, born in 1990.

Jones' adopted son Christian now races in various forms of motorsport.

His eldest daughter, Emma, has two daughters (born 2001 and 2004).

Honours
Jones was made a Member of the Order of the British Empire (MBE) in 1980 for "service to motor racing" and was inducted into the Sport Australia Hall of Fame in 1989.

Jones and his father Stan, along with Graham and Damon Hill, and Keke and Nico Rosberg, are the only father/son combinations to ever win the Australian Grand Prix.

Racing record

Career summary

Complete World Sportscar Championship results
(key) (Races in bold indicate pole position) (Races in italics indicate fastest lap)

Footnotes

Complete European F5000 Championship results
(key) (Races in bold indicate pole position; races in italics indicate fastest lap.)

Complete Formula One World Championship results
(key) (Races in bold indicate pole position; races in italics indicate fastest lap.)

Non-championship Formula One results
(key) (Races in bold indicate pole position; races in italics indicate fastest lap.)

Complete Shellsport International Series results
(key) (Races in bold indicate pole position; races in italics indicate fastest lap.)

American open-wheel racing
(key) (Races in bold indicate pole position; races in italics indicate fastest lap.)

USAC Championship Car

CART PPG Indy Car World Series

Complete European Formula Two Championship results
(key) (Races in bold indicate pole position; races in italics indicate fastest lap)

Complete BMW M1 Procar Championship results
(key) (Races in bold indicate pole position; races in italics indicate fastest lap)

Complete 24 Hours of Le Mans results

V8 Supercar Championship results
(key) (Races in bold indicate pole position) (Races in italics indicate fastest lap)

Complete Asia-Pacific Touring Car Championship results
(key) (Races in bold indicate pole position; races in italics indicate fastest lap.)

Complete Bathurst 1000 results

* Super Touring race

Complete Grand Prix Masters results
(key)

References

Notes

Bibliography

External links
Richard's F1 interview with Alan Jones
Motor Sport Magazine: Lunch with... Alan Jones, by Simon Taylor (April 2008)
Driver Data Base Stats
Racing Reference Profile

1946 births
Living people
24 Hours of Le Mans drivers
A1 Grand Prix team owners
Arrows Formula One drivers
Australian Formula One drivers
Australian Members of the Order of the British Empire
Australian people of English descent
Australian Touring Car Championship drivers
BRDC Gold Star winners
British Formula Three Championship drivers
Formula One World Drivers' Champions
Formula One race winners
Grand Prix Masters drivers
Haas Lola Formula One drivers
Hesketh Formula One drivers
Hill Formula One drivers
International Race of Champions drivers
People educated at Xavier College
Racing drivers from Victoria (Australia)
Shadow Formula One drivers
Sport Australia Hall of Fame inductees
Sportspeople from Melbourne
Surtees Formula One drivers
Supercars Championship drivers
Williams Formula One drivers
World Sportscar Championship drivers
Japanese Sportscar Championship drivers
Australian Endurance Championship drivers
BMW M drivers
Porsche Motorsports drivers
TOM'S drivers
Newman/Haas Racing drivers
Jaguar Racing drivers
Dick Johnson Racing drivers